Ashraf is an Arabic name meaning 'most honorable one' or 'very noble'. It is used by many Arabs and non-Arabs regardless of their religious affiliation, both Christians and Muslims alike. In French-speaking contexts the transliteration is Achraf.

The name is not to be confused with the word  (with a long second ā) which is the plural of the word , denoting the descendants of the Islamic prophet Muhammad. Although both words share the same root,  is not normally used as a proper name. Its singular  (also 'Shareef', 'Sherif', etc.), on the other hand, is used as a proper name.

People

Historical
Al-Ashraf Khalil (c.1262–1293), Bahrid sultan of Egypt from 1290 to 1293
Al-Ashraf Sha'ban,  Bahrid sultan of Egypt from 1363 to 1376
Al-Ashraf Sayf-ad-Din Barsbay, Burjid sultan of Egypt from 1422 to 1438
al-Ashraf Sayf-ad-Din Qaitbay  (c. 1416/1418 – 1496), Burjid sultan of Egypt from 1468 to 1496
al-Ashraf Qansuh al-Ghawri, Burjid sultan of Egypt from 1501 to 1516
al-Ashraf Tuman bay II, Burjid sultan of Egypt in 1516
Ashraf Hotak, ruler of Afghanistan from 1725 to 1729
Ashraf us-Sultana Qajar (born 1808) Princess of Persia

Contemporary

Given name
Ashraf Abdelwahab, Egyptian academic, Business Executive and politician
Ashraf Barhom (born 1979), Israeli Arab actor
Achraf Bencharki (born 1994), Moroccan footballer
Ashraf Choudhary (born 1949), Pakistani-born scientist in the field of agricultural engineering and member of the New Zealand Parliament
Ashraf Dehghani (born 1949), political activist and member of the Iranian People's Fadaee Guerrillas
Ashraf El-Ashmawi, Egyptian author, judge and legal scholar
Ashraf El-Gharably (born 1979), Egyptian Greco-Roman wrestler
Ashraf Fahmy (1936–2001), Egyptian film director
Ashraf Ghori (born 1973), artist
Achraf Hakimi (born 1998), Moroccan footballer
Ashraf Hendricks (born 1984), South African footballer
Ashraf Hossain (died 2020), Bangladeshi politician
Ashraf Johaardien (born 1974), South African playwright
Ashraf Kasem (born 1966), Egyptian footballer
Achraf Lazaar (born 1992), Moroccan footballer
Ashraf Marwan (1944–2007), Egyptian businessman
Ashraf Nu'man (born 1986), Palestinian footballer
Ashraf Pahlavi (1919–2016), twin sister of Mohammad Reza Pahlavi, the Shah of Iran
Ashraf Qazi (born 1942), Pakistani politician and diplomat
Ashraf Rashid (1948–2004), Pakistani general and head of SSG
Ashraf Rifi (born 1954), Lebanese police chief
Achraf Tadili (born 1980), Canadian athlete

Middle name
Mohammad Ashraf Ghani (born 1949), Afghan politician

Surname
Aedy Ashraf (born 1993), Malaysian actor
Nasim Ashraf, Pakistani politician
Raja Pervaiz Ashraf (born 1950), Pakistani politician

See also
Sherif, another Arabic name taken from the same root
Şerif, the name Sherif in Turkish

References

Arabic masculine given names
Pakistani masculine given names
Unisex given names